Servius Sulpicius Galba may refer to:

 Servius Sulpicius Galba (consul 144 BC)
 Servius Sulpicius Galba (consul 108 BC)
 Servius Sulpicius Galba (praetor 54 BC), assassin of Julius Caesar
 Galba, born Servius Sulpicius Galba, Roman emperor from AD 68 to 69

See also 
 Galba (cognomen)
 Sulpicius Severus